Cory McGarr is an American politician and a Republican member of the Arizona House of Representatives elected to represent District 17 in 2022.

Elections
2022 McGarr and Rachel Jones won a five-way contest in the Republican Primary. They went on to defeat Democrats Dana Allmond and Brian Radford in the general election.

References

External links
 Biography at Ballotpedia

Republican Party members of the Arizona House of Representatives
Living people
Year of birth missing (living people)
21st-century American politicians
People from Marana, Arizona